Shirk-Edwards House is a historic home located at Peru, Miami County, Indiana.  It was built about 1862, as a two-story, Italianate style brick mansion.  It was renovated in 1921 in the Classical Revival.  It rests on a limestone foundation and has a low-pitched hipped roof. The front facade features a full-width, two-story porch supported by four full and two engaged columns.

It was listed on the National Register of Historic Places in 1995.

References

Houses on the National Register of Historic Places in Indiana
Italianate architecture in Indiana
Neoclassical architecture in Indiana
Houses completed in 1862
Buildings and structures in Miami County, Indiana
National Register of Historic Places in Miami County, Indiana